Michailas Anisimovas (born October 11, 1984) is a Ukrainian–Lithuanian professional basketball player.

Lietuvos Rytas
After an impressive season in Klaipėda, he was signed by Lietuvos rytas in 2007. He was initially expected to develop his game to higher level to become one of the better centers in Lithuania, but failed to impress the head coach and was receiving only a few minutes per game. He improved his statistics in the 2008/2009 season, and became a more reliable bench player. In September 2009 he was signed by Budivelnyk Kyiv.

Personal life
Michailas Anisimovas currently holds a dual Lithuanian and Ukrainian citizenship.

Awards and achievements
Baltic Basketball League Presidents Cup winner: 2008
LKF Cup winner: 2009
UBL best center of the season: 2015

References

1984 births
Living people
BC Budivelnyk players
BC Neptūnas players
BC Rytas players
BC Šiauliai players
BK Barons players
BK Ventspils players
Centers (basketball)
Lithuanian men's basketball players
LSU-Atletas basketball players
Basketball players from Kyiv
Ukrainian men's basketball players